The 1789 New York gubernatorial election was held in April 1789 to elect the Governor and the Lieutenant Governor of New York.

Candidates
Incumbent George Clinton and justice of the New York Supreme Court Robert Yates, both members of the Anti-Administration faction, ran for Governor.

Incumbent Pierre Van Cortlandt was the only candidate for Lieutenant Governor.

Results
Clinton and Van Cortlandt were elected Governor and Lieutenant Governor respectively.

Sources
Result: The Tribune Almanac 1841

See also
New York gubernatorial elections
New York state elections

1789
1789 United States gubernatorial elections
Gubernatorial